The 1953 Boston University Terriers football team was an American football team that represented Boston University as an independent during the 1953 college football season. In its seventh season under head coach Aldo Donelli, the team compiled a 5–3–1 record and outscored by their opponents by a total of 224 to 135.

Schedule

References

Boston University
Boston University Terriers football seasons
Boston University Terriers football